The hook-billed kite (Chondrohierax uncinatus), is a  bird of prey in the family Accipitridae, which also includes many other diurnal raptors such as kites, eagles, and harriers. It occurs in the Americas, including the Rio Grande Valley of Texas in the United States, Mexico, the Caribbean, Central America, and tropical South America.

Description
It is a mid-sized, slender raptor with an invariably striped belly and banded tail but there is probably more individual variation in color and in size of bill than in any other species of diurnal raptor. Birds from beneath can look blackish or gray (especially males) and brown or brick-red (females) variously. This renders species identification at times extremely difficult. The downcurved hook at the tip of the beak is apparent on perched and low-flying birds.

Ecology
Tree snails  (e.g. Homolanyx and Polymita) are a vital component of the hook-billed kite’s diet. The density of their population within a region is proportional to the presence of tree snails. It has also been observed that the beak of the hook-billed kite has adapted in size and shape between different regions of their territory in response to the species of tree snail available to them. However, terrestrial snails (e.g. Strophocheilus), aquatic snails (e.g. Pomacea), frogs, salamanders, lizards, small mammals, crabs, spiders, caterpillars, and insects are also taken. It supposedly also hunts other birds, but this seems unlikely. When it finds a tree snail it holds it with its talon and uses its beak to pry open the shell.

Breeding
The nest, a flimsy platform of sticks, is built by both sexes. The hook-billed kite lays two to three buff-white eggs marked with red-brown. Incubation is by both sexes. Semialtricial young stay in the nest 35–45 days and are fed by both sexes. This raptor is often considered sluggish and retiring, preferring to perch inside leafy canopy when not flying.

Taxonomy
The critically endangered Cuban kite (C. wilsonii) is considered by some authors to be a subspecies of the hook-billed kite.

References

External links

Stamps for Cuba, Honduras; (includes RangeMap)
 Associação Mãe-da-lua Hook-billed Kite

hook-billed kite
Birds of prey
Birds of the Rio Grande valleys
Birds of Central America
Birds of the Yucatán Peninsula
Birds of Trinidad and Tobago
Birds of Grenada
Birds of the Guianas
Birds of Bolivia
Birds of Colombia
Birds of Ecuador
Birds of Paraguay
Birds of Peru
Birds of the Amazon Basin
Birds of the Atlantic Forest
hook-billed kite
hook-billed kite
Birds of Brazil